St. Ann's Academy may refer to:

 St. Ann's Academy in Manhattan, New York, now Archbishop Molloy High School
 St. Ann's Academy (Hornell, New York), an elementary school (including pre-K) in the Catholic tradition
 St. Ann's Academy (Kamloops), a Roman Catholic secondary school
 St. Ann's Academy (Victoria, British Columbia), a Roman Catholic secondary school

See also

 St Anne's Academy